Svobodny Trud is a rural locality (a khutor) in Dzherokayskoye Rural Settlement of Shovgenovsky District, the Republic of Adygea, Russia. The population was 330 as of 2018. There are 6 streets.

Geography 
Svobodny Trud is located between the auls of Dzherokay and Khachemzy, 9 km southeast of Khakurinokhabl (the district's administrative centre) by road. Dzerokay is the nearest rural locality.

References 

Rural localities in Shovgenovsky District